Lin Xue, also known by courtesy name Lin Tiansu, was a Chinese poet, painter, and calligrapher during the Ming dynasty, noted for her landscape paintings. 

Lin lived by the West Lake in Hangzhou, where she worked as a courtesan until her marriage into a respectable family.

Lin drew the attention of leading poets and painters of the time, including Li Liufang and Dong Qichang. She painted in the latter's Southern School style, and is described as having a fluid hand with a feminine sensibility. Her landscape album of 1621 contained copies of earlier masterworks, and her copy style is considered exquisite by critics.

List of works 
 Landscape (folding fan), ink on gold paper, 1620, private collection
 Landscape after Huang Gongwang (Landschaft im Stil des Huang Gongwang) (folding fan), ink on gold paper, ca. 1620, in the Museum für Ostasiatische Kunst, Köln
 Geese Descending on Sands (hanging scroll), ink and color on silk, 1621, in the National Museum of Asian Art, Smithsonian Institution
 Prunus and Bamboo (hanging scroll), ink and slight color on paper, 1621, in the Art Institute of Chicago
 Landscape (handscroll), ink and colors on paper, 1622, private collection
 Landscape (folding fan), ink on gold paper, 1642, private collection

References 

17th-century Chinese painters
17th-century Chinese poets
17th-century Chinese calligraphers
Chinese women artists
Chinese women poets
Women calligraphers
Chinese women painters
17th-century Chinese women artists
17th-century Chinese women writers
Year of birth missing
Year of death missing
Artists from Fujian
Ming dynasty artists
Ming dynasty poets
Ming dynasty courtesans